Kuppathu Raja may refer to:
 Kuppathu Raja (1979 film), an Indian Tamil-language film
 Kuppathu Raja (2019 film), an Indian Tamil-language action comedy-drama film